The Grand Master of Magic Award is a lifetime achievement award presented by the Brotherhood of Auckland Magicians Incorporated on behalf of the magicians of New Zealand.  It was first awarded in 1969 and to date it has been awarded on nineteen occasions.

Criteria for the Grand Master of Magic 

The criteria for the Grand Master of Magic Award was formalised in 1998 and is as follows :

"Its purpose is to honour those magicians who are acknowledged by their fellow magicians to be masters of the art and craft of magic.  The recipients first and foremost must be performers of a high standard.  In addition they might be originators of magical effects, or administrators giving time and expertise to running societies and conventions.  They could be consistent competition winners, or have an international standing, or be known only in the New Zealand setting.  But above all they are people who have served magic well, have graced our art, and made a special contribution over many years."

Any nomination must also be measured against the standard achieved by the previous recipients.

Recipients 

 1969 – Edgar Benyon
 1976 – Jack Read
 1985 – Jon & Janet Zealando
 1988 – Jim Reilly
 1989 – Harold Chandler
 1990 – Francis Newmarch JP
 1995 – Peter & Phillipa Evans
 1998 – Tony Wilson
 1999 – Graham Grant
 2001 – Barry Brook QSM  
 2001 – Bernard Reid 
 2002 – Burns Scandrett  
 2004 – Wayne Rogers
 2006 – Alan Watson QSM
 2008 – Greg Britt MNZM
 2009 – Ken Bates
 2013 – Richard Webster
 2015 – Paul Romhany
 2019 – Paul Bates

References

External links 
 Brotherhood of Auckland Magicians (BAM) Website, New Zealand
 Grand Masters of Magic, FAQ with nomination procedure

Magic (illusion)
Performing arts awards
Awards established in 1969
New Zealand awards
1969 establishments in New Zealand